Juan Ramón Rivas (born October 11, 1994) is a Puerto Rican-American professional basketball player who currently plays for Cariduros de Fajardo of the Baloncesto Superior Nacional. He represented Puerto Rico on the National Team, and played college basketball at UMKC and North Georgia.

Early life
Rivas was born in Orlando, Florida. He attended Olympia High School, graduating in 2013. His senior season he averaged 17 ppg and 9 rpg, earning an All-District nod and team MVP. He also served as team captain. In addition to basketball, Rivas also ran cross country and participated in track and field.

College
As a freshman at UKMC in 2013-2014, Rivas redshirted. His sophomore year he averaged 1.5 ppg in limited minutes.

Following his sophomore season, Rivas transferred to North Georgia, an NCAA Division II program. He averaged 12.3 ppg and 7.7 rpg in his final year of college basketball.

Professional
Rivas began his professional career in the LNBP of Mexico with Soles de Mexicali. He averaged 3.0 ppg and 2.7 rpg in 13 mpg.

He was selected with the first pick in the 2018 Baloncesto Superior Nacional Sorteo (Draft) by Santeros de Aguada. His rookie season he averaged 3.3 ppg and 1.5 rpg in 10.3 mpg.

Rivas next signed with CB Tormes of Spain’s third-tier league, LEB Plata. He averaged 10.2 ppg and 7.0 rpg in 28.8 mpg.

Rivas returned to Aguada the next season in the BSN. He averaged 4.0 ppg and 2.1 rpg in 11 mpg before being traded to Indios de Mayagüez. Aguada would go on to win the championship that season. In Mayagüez, Rivas would average 4.5 ppg and 2.0 rpg in 16.5 mpg.

In 2019-2020,  Rivas would next play in Argentina’s top division, averaging 6.1 ppg, 5.9 rpg and 1.0 apg for Asociación Deportiva Atenas.

National Team 
Rivas competed for the National Team in 2016. For the window of the next season, he was among the final two cuts and not asked to return.

Personal 
Rivas is the son of legendary basketball player Ramón Rivas.

References 

Living people
1994 births
Baloncesto Superior Nacional players
People from Orlando, Florida